Olli Hiidensalo (born 2 February 1991) is a Finnish biathlete. He was born in Nummi-Pusula. He has competed in the Biathlon World Cup, and represented Finland at the Biathlon World Championships 2016.

Biathlon results
All results are sourced from the International Biathlon Union.

Olympic Games
0 medals

World Championships
0 medals

*During Olympic seasons competitions are only held for those events not included in the Olympic program.
**The single mixed relay was added as an event in 2019.

References

External links

1991 births
Living people
Finnish male biathletes
Biathletes at the 2018 Winter Olympics
Biathletes at the 2022 Winter Olympics
Olympic biathletes of Finland
People from Lohja
Sportspeople from Uusimaa